Joseph d'Aguin was president of the Parliament of Toulouse in the Kingdom of France. His only daughter Martha Henrietta was the first wife of Nicholas Barnewall, 14th Baron Trimlestown of Ireland, and mother of his only surviving son and heir.

References 

Year of birth missing
Year of death missing
18th-century French politicians